Swallow Lake is a lake in the Unorganized Part of Thunder Bay District in Northwestern Ontario, Canada. It is in the Great Lakes Basin and is the source of the Matawin River. There are two unnamed inflows, at the southwest and east. The primary outflow, at the south, is the Matawin River, which flows via the Kaministiquia River to Lake Superior.

References

Other map sources:

Lakes of Thunder Bay District